Heruka is also a name for the deity of the Cakrasaṃvara Tantra.

Heruka (Sanskrit;), is the name of a category of wrathful deities, enlightened beings in Vajrayana Buddhism that adopt a fierce countenance to benefit sentient beings. In East Asia, these are called Wisdom Kings.

Herukas represent the embodiment of indivisible bliss and emptiness. They appear as Iṣṭha-devatā or meditational deities for tantric sādhanā, usually placed in a mandala and often appearing in Yab-Yum.

Derivation and meaning of the term
Heruka represents wrathful imagery with indivisible emptiness (śūnyatā), bliss, peace, wisdom, compassion (bodhicitta), and love. Herukas represent unified consciousness, with emptiness being a reflection of "non-phenomena" or emptiness which is "all love," or removal of imagery to reach universal love, mercy, and compassion-mind.

Interpretation of Heruka is similar to the female ḍākiṇī or buddha Vajrayogini.

The Sanskrit term Heruka was translated into both Chinese and Tibetan as "blood drinker," which scholar Ronald Davidson calls "curious," speculating that the nonliteral translation is derived from an association the term has with cremation grounds and 'charnel grounds' (Sanskrit: śmāśāna) (which absorb the blood of the dead). Sanskrit terms for blood drinker include asrikpa, reflecting a Sanskrit word for blood (asrik), and raktapa, raktapayin, or rakshasa, derived from an alternate root term for blood (rakta). Unlike the Chinese and Tibetan terms used to translate it, the Sanskrit term heruka does not literally mean blood drinker, although the fact that it was rendered as such into two other languages strongly suggests an according Indian interpretive etymology.

Eight Herukas of the Nyingma Mahayoga

The eight Herukas (Wylie: sgrub pa bka’ brgyad) of the Nyingma mahayoga tradition (and their corresponding sadhanas) are said to have been received by Padmakara from the Eight Vidyadharas (Tib. Rigdzin), or Eight Great Acharyas: Manjushrimitra, Nagarjuna, Vajrahumkara, Vimalamitra, Prabhahasti, Dhanasamskrita, Shintamgarbha and Guhyachandra. They were proficient in the practices of, respectively:

1) Yamantaka (Tib.) the wrathful Manjushri, the deity of body;
2) Hayagriva (Tib. Pema Sung) the wrathful Avalokiteśvara, the deity of speech;
3) Vishuddha/Sri Samyak (Tib. Yangdak Thuk,) the wrathful Vajrapani deity of mind;
4) Mahottara (Tib. Chem Chok,) the wrathful Samantabhadra, the deity of enlightened qualities;
5) Vajrakilaya/Vajrakumara (Tib.), the wrathful Vajrasattva,  the deity of purification;
6) Matarah (Tib. Mamo Botong) the wrathful Akasagarbha, the deity of calling and dispatching;
7) Lokastotrapuja-natha (Tib.) the wrathful Ksitigarbha, the deity of worldly offering and praise;
8) Vajramantrabhiru (Tib.) the wrathful Maitreya, the deity of wrathful mantras.

Padmasambhava is quoted in the Bardo Thodol (Antarabhavatantra - "Tibetan Book of the Dead"):  "The crucial point is indeed that those who have meditated on the formal description of these Herukakaya ('bodies of Heruka'), and also made offerings and praise to them, or, at the very least, have simply seen their painted and sculpted images, may recognise the forms that arise here and attain moksha (liberation)."

See also
 Wrathful deities

Notes

References
Khenchen Palden Rinpoche. The Dark Red Amulet: Oral Instructions on the Practice of Vajrakilaya. New York: Snow Lion Publications, 2009 .

External links
 

 
Buddhist deities
Yidams